Uzooma Okeke (born September 3, 1970) is a former Canadian Football League tackle for the Montreal Alouettes. He won a Grey Cup with Montreal in 2002.  Okeke is currently the Football Operations Assistant/Scout for the Montreal Alouettes.

College career
Uzooma Okeke was a two-year starter at offensive tackle at Southern Methodist University (SMU), playing both offense and defense. He was on the team that brought football back to SMU following their penalty. Under the tutelage of Forrest Gregg, he blossomed both on the football field and in persevering to obtain his college degree. He graduated from SMU with a degree in Public Relations.

CFL career
Forrest Gregg recruited him to play for the Shreveport Pirates in 1994 and 1995, and that began his CFL career. He moved to the Ottawa Rough Riders in 1996, but in 1997 started his very successful (10 year) career with the Montreal Alouettes. He was a durable mainstay of their offensive line, being named an All-Star six times, and in 1998 won the Leo Dandurand Trophy as best lineman in the East, and in 1999 won the CFL's Most Outstanding Offensive Lineman Award. He retired as a player prior to the 2007 season and joined the Alouettes as a scout.

He was inducted into the Canadian Football Hall of Fame in 2014.

References

1970 births
African-American players of Canadian football
Canadian Football Hall of Fame inductees
Canadian football offensive linemen
Garland High School alumni
Living people
Montreal Alouettes players
Ottawa Rough Riders players
People from Beaumont, Texas
Shreveport Pirates players
SMU Mustangs football players
21st-century African-American sportspeople
20th-century African-American sportspeople